Agnetha Fältskogs svensktoppar is a compilation album released in 1998 by Swedish pop singer Agnetha Fältskog, known from the Sweden pop group ABBA. The songs on the album are hits by her on the Swedish hitlist Svensktoppen.

Track listing
Tack för en underbar vanlig dag
När du tar mej i din famn
Jag var så kär
Om tårar vore guld
Vart skall min kärlek föra? (I Don't Know How to Love Him)
En sång om sorg och glädje (Union Silver)
Dröm är dröm och saga saga (Era bello il mio ragazzo)
Så glad som dina ögon
En sång och en saga
SOS
Doktorn!
Fram för svenska sommaren (Chic a chic a dee)
Allting har förändrat sej
Utan dej, mitt liv går vidare
Zigenarvän
Många gånger än
Sången föder dig tillbaka

References

External links

1998 compilation albums
Agnetha Fältskog compilation albums
Svensktoppen